Orono is a town in Penobscot County, Maine, United States. Located on the Penobscot and Stillwater rivers, it was first settled by American colonists in 1774. They named it in honor of Chief Joseph Orono, a sachem of the indigenous Penobscot nation who long occupied this territory.

In the nineteenth century, the town became a center of the lumber industry. Sawmills on the rivers were powered by the water, and logs were floated downriver on the Penobscot for shipping and export from coastal ports.

Since 1865 it has been the location of the University of Maine, established as a land-grant institution and the state's flagship educational institution. In the fall of 2018, the university enrolled 11,404 students at Orono. Not including university residents, the town's population was 11,183 at the 2020 census.

Geography 
The town is divided by the Stillwater River, a branch of the Penobscot River. It occupies part of  Marsh Island, as well as some smaller islands such as Ayers Island, which is surrounded by the Penobscot and the Stillwater rivers, and the remainder of the town is on the mainland. The Orono Dam impounds the Stillwater River at its confluence with the Penobscot River near downtown Orono.

Climate

This climatic region is typified by large seasonal temperature differences, with warm to hot (and often humid) summers and cold (sometimes severely cold) winters. Orono has a warm-summer humid continental climate, according to the Köppen Climate Classification system is "Dfb", thus abbreviated ed in on climate maps.

Conservation
The Orono Land Trust operates a number of protected areas in Orono. Piney Knoll Conservation Area, situated alongside the Penobscot River, is known for its walking trails and bird-watching. The University of Maine also owns a considerable amount of protected land in the town. Prominent parcels include Dwight B. Demeritt Forest.

Demographics

2010 census
As of the census of 2010, there were 10,363 people, 2,831 households, and 1,229 families living in the town. The racial makeup of the town was 93.7% White, 1.2% African American, 1.1% Native American, 1.9% Asian, 0.4% from other races, and 1.7% from two or more races. Hispanic or Latino of any race were 1.5% of the population.

There were 2,831 households, of which 17.8% had children under the age of 18 living with them, 32.9% were married couples living together, 7.0% had a female householder with no husband present, 3.5% had a male householder with no wife present, and 56.6% were non-families. 30.6% of all households were made up of individuals, and 11.9% had someone living alone who was 65 years of age or older. The average household size was 2.29 and the average family size was 2.77.

The median age in the town was 21.8 years. 8.6% of residents were under the age of 18; 55.9% were between the ages of 18 and 24; 12.2% were from 25 to 44; 13.1% were from 45 to 64; and 10.4% were 65 years of age or older. The gender makeup of the town was 51.8% male and 48.2% female.

Notable people 

 Charles J. Dunn, Chief Justice of the Maine Supreme Judicial Court
 Wallace Rider Farrington, territorial governor of Hawaii
 Merritt Lyndon Fernald (1873–1950), botanist
 Constance Hunting, poet, publisher
 Frances Laughton Mace, poet
 Jonathan Norcross, inventor, 4th mayor of Atlanta
 Ralph Perkins, state legislator
 Elizabeth Schneider, state senator
 Joseph B. Treat, Wisconsin politician
 Nathaniel Treat, Maine politician
 Nathaniel B. Treat, Wisconsin politician
 Eva Valesh (1866–1956), labor journalist
 Israel Washburn Jr., US congressman, a founder of the Republican Party, 29th Governor of Maine
 Dorothy Clarke Wilson, novelist, playwright

Points of interest
 University of Maine
 Fay Hyland Botanical Plantation
 Lyle E. Littlefield Ornamentals Trial Garden
 Old Fire Engine House
 Pat's Pizza
 Jeremiah Colburn House

Notes

References

External links

Town of Orono Official Website
University of Maine
Orono High School
Asa Adams Elementary School

 
Populated places established in 1774
Towns in Penobscot County, Maine
1774 establishments in the Thirteen Colonies